The Roman Shukhevych statue in Edmonton, Alberta, Canada is a controversial sculpture located near the Ukrainian Youth Association narodny dim of the Ukrainian nationalist Roman Shukhevych, a military leader of the Ukrainian Insurgent Army (UPA), and one of the perpetrators of the Galicia-Volhynia massacres of approximately 100,000 Poles.

Description and location 
The bronze bust is located on private property near the Ukrainian Youth Unity Complex in Edmonton. It was partly funded by Canadian taxpayers.

The statue consists of a bust of Roman Shukhevych, the Ukrainian ultranationalist and World War II Nazi collaborator. It was erected in 1973 by Ukrainian veterans of the Second World War who emigrated to Canada.

Critical reception and vandalism 

The Russian Embassy to Canada objected to the presence of the statue in October 2018.

The Friends of Simon Wiesenthal Center for Holocaust Studies called for the removal of the statue in 2021, stating that the statue and another local statue honours "Nazi collaborators and war criminals". Jewish group B'nai Brith also called for the statue's removal.

The bust was vandalised with the word "Nazi scum" in 2019. The sculpture was again dubbed with graffiti in 2021 with the words "Actual Nazi" written in red paint. In reaction to the second vandalism, the Ukrainian Youth Association issued as statement calling the accusations that Ukrainian nationalist fighters during the Second World War were Nazis "fake news" and "Communist propaganda".

In October 2022, journalist and activist Duncan Kinney was charged with graffiti related to the vandalism.

See also 

 List of Nazi monuments in Canada

References 

Busts in Canada
Sculptures of men in Canada
Monuments and memorials in Alberta
1973 sculptures
Organization of Ukrainian Nationalists
World War II memorials in Canada
2022 controversies
Outdoor sculptures in Canada
Ukrainian-Canadian culture in Alberta
Statues in Canada
Vandalized works of art in Canada